The Skirmish at Farnham Church was an engagement during the War of 1812. The British bombarded North Farnham Church and assaulted the church on land. The strength of either side is unknown, but the battle was fought between British troops and Virginia militia. The engagement at the northern end of the Farnham Church complex occurred on December 6, 1814, the British failed to capture their target.

References

 Borneman, Walter H. 1812 The War that forged a nation 

Farnham Church
Farnham Church
Farnham Church
Farnham Church
Farnham Church
Farnham Church
1814 in Virginia
December 1814 events